Pandrasus is the fictional king of Greece and father of Innogen in Geoffrey of Monmouth's pseudo-history Historia Regum Britanniae.

Story 

In the Historia Regum Britanniae, Pandrasus is king of the Greeks, and holds the Trojan descendants of Helenus as slaves, who had been captured by Pyrrhus as punishment for the death of his father Achilles in the Trojan War. Brutus of Troy discovers these Trojans after being exiled from Italy, and rises to become their leader.

Assaracus – a Greek noble of Trojan descent through his mother's side, who owns three castles – sides with the Trojans, as his fully Greek half brother had the support of Pandrasus to take his castles. Brutus agrees to support Assaracus, gathers all the Trojans and fortifies Assaracus' towns, then retreats with Assaracus and the Trojans to the woods and hills. Brutus sends a letter to Pandrasus, requesting that the Trojans be freed and allowed either to remain living in the woods, or to depart from Greece.

Pandrasus consults with his nobles, then gathers an army to march on the town of Sparatinum where he suspects Brutus to be. Brutus ambushes them on their way to Sparatinum with three thousand men, and slaughters the Greeks as they try to fall back to the far side of the river Akalon (possibly the Achelous or Acheron). Pandrasus' brother Antigonus attempts to rally the Greeks, but ends up being captured along with his companion Anacletus. Brutus reinforces the town with six hundred men then retreats to the woods, while Pandrasus reassembles the Greek forces and then lays siege to the town.

While the Greeks are encamped around Sparatinum, Brutus forces Anacletus to trick the night sentries into leaving their posts to help Antigonus, and then attacks the sleeping Greeks, massacring nearly all of them, except Pandrasus, who is kept alive. The Trojans hold a council, and decide that they have to demand their freedom to leave Greece, with plentiful resources to do so, as Pandrasus would regain his strength and have them all killed if they remained. Pandrasus is then brought in, and threatened with a cruel death if he does not agree to this, in addition to giving Brutus the hand of his eldest daughter Innogen in marriage. Pandrasus complies, offering to remain a hostage until they leave, and says that he was glad his daughter was to be married to such a great leader as Brutus.

Analysis 
Pandrasus is one of several characters that appear to have been invented by Geoffrey for the Historia. Academic Jacob Hammer suggests that he may have had in mind one of the two characters named Pandarus from Virgil's Aeneid (29–19 BCE). One manuscript of the Dares Phrygius even spells the name Pandarus as "Pandrasus".

Peter Roberts suggests that as other stories state that Pyrrhus took Helenus to Epirus, Pandrasus should therefore be considered according to this story to be king of Epirus, which would tally with the river Akalon mentioned in the story being the Acheron. He continues by noting that as the events of Pandrasus are said to have taken place about eighty years after the Trojan War, it also matches the timeframe of other accounts of the expulsion of the Achaeans from the Peloponnese around this time, which could have led them to build the "Spartan Castle" (Sparatinum) mentioned in the Historia, possibly around Pandosia.

Geoffrey reused the name Pandrasus later in the Historia as the name of the king of Egypt at the time of King Arthur.

Scholars from the late nineteenth to mid-twentieth century who studied Eustache Deschamps' ballad in praise of Geoffrey Chaucer ( on) interpreted a difficult line of the poem "" as meaning "for those ignorant of the tongue of Pandrasus". Later scholarship suggested that "a Pandarus for those ignorant of the language" was more likely, referring to Pandarus from Chaucer's Troilus and Criseyde.

References 

British traditional history
Medieval legends
Mythological kings